is a Japanese professional football club located in Tokushima, capital of Tokushima Prefecture. The club currently playing in the J2 League, the Japanese second tier of professional football league.

Name origin
The name, "Vortis" was named in 1997 (see below), and it was explained as a coinage of Italian "Vortice" (meaning whirlpool, after the famous Naruto whirlpool in Naruto Strait). The name was chosen to exhibit the dynamics of a whirlpool in the hope of swallowing up the whole audience in excitement by its power, speed and unity.

History
Founded in 1955 as Otsuka Pharmaceutical Co., Ltd. Soccer Club, VORTIS joined the J-League in 2005. They are still sponsored by Otsuka's best-known brand, Pocari Sweat sports drink.

They were first promoted to the old Japan Soccer League Division 2 in 1989, but the company's reluctance to professionalize the team forced it to compete in the former JFL and current JFL. In the 1997 old JFL season, they first sported a Vortis Tokushima name, but the lack of fan interest at the time forced them to go back to the corporate identity. They finally adopted the Tokushima Vortis name for good after winning the new JFL championship in 2004 and being promoted.

The first season in J2 was naturally a difficult one for Vortis, but they surprised many sceptics with their determination and quality of play. The team rose as high as fourth place, at one point, before slipping down the table later in the season to finish ninth. In 2006, the team was forced to rebuild, as the players who took the team into the J.League began to hit the ceiling of their abilities and made way for younger replacements. As a result, despite the encouragement of a local rivalry with Ehime FC, Tokushima drifted down-table, and they followed it up with a last-place finish in 2007 and 2008.

In 2013, they earned fourth place in J2, matching the same placement they had two years before in the division and twenty years before in the old JFL Division 1; this time they won the playoff, defeating Kyoto Sanga F.C. in the final round at the National Stadium in Tokyo, thus becoming the first professional Shikoku football club to compete in the top division of their national league.

Until their promotion, they were the only former JSL member currently a member of the J.League which has never competed in the top tier of Japanese football. With promotion and the creation of the J3 League in 2014, the distinction was taken over by Blaublitz Akita.

In the 2019 season, they finished 4th again and were one win away from a return to J1 in the playoffs, but ultimately failed to beat Shonan Bellmare away in the final game. In 2020, despite the COVID-19 pandemic, they did one better and were promoted as J2 champions.

Team name transition
Otsuka Pharmaceutical (1955)
Tokushima Vortis FC (2005)

Stadium
The team is  Their home stadium is Naruto Otsuka Sports Park Pocari Sweat Stadium, in Naruto, Tokushima.

League & cup record

Key

Honours
J2 League: 1
 2020

Japan Football League: 2
 2003, 2004

Shikoku Football League: 4
 1978, 1979, 1981, 1989

Current players

Out on loan

Club staff
For the 2023 season.

Managerial history

Kit evolution

References

External links
  Tokushima Vortis Official Web Site

 
J.League clubs
Japan Soccer League clubs
Football clubs in Japan
Association football clubs established in 1955
Sports teams in Tokushima Prefecture
1955 establishments in Japan
Japan Football League (1992–1998) clubs
Japan Football League clubs
Otsuka Pharmaceutical